Donna Martin (born 11 January 1980) is an Australian rower. She competed in the women's double sculls event at the 2004 Summer Olympics.

References

External links
 

1980 births
Living people
Australian female rowers
Olympic rowers of Australia
Rowers at the 2004 Summer Olympics
Rowers from Melbourne
21st-century Australian women